General admission is a ticketing arrangement for events.

General Admission may also refer to:
 General Admission (Machine Gun Kelly album)
 General Admission (Pat McGee Band album)